Sasquatch is another name for Bigfoot, an ape-like creature of North American folklore. 

Sasquatch may also refer to:

Sasquatch (band), an American metal band
Sasquatch (comics), two related superhero characters in Marvel Comics
Sasquatch (TV series), docuseries on marijuana and bigfoot in Mendocino County, California
Sasquatch (novel), a 1998 novel by Roland Smith
Sasquatch (ride), a drop ride at Great Escape amusement park
Sasquatch! Music Festival, an annual music festival in George, Washington, United States
Sasquatch (Darkstalkers), a character in Darkstalkers
Sasquatch, also known as The Untold, a 2002 horror film
Sneaky Sasquatch, an Apple Arcade game released in 2019 about a Sasquatch living in a campground in Canada